Music Life is the thirteenth studio album by Japanese pop rock band Glay, released on November 5, 2014. It reached #2 at the Oricon weekly charts, #5 at their monthly chart for November, and #58 at their 2014 Year-End Chart, besides reaching #4 at the Billboard Japan Top Albums chart.

The album was released in three different editions: one regular edition with the 11 new tracks, and two special editions, each coming with a second CD (Ballads Best☆Melodies or Ballads Best☆Memories) containing previously released ballads by the band. The track list of both compilations was decided by fans by voting.

The cover art of the album was inspired by The Beatles' Revolver, and it was indeed designed by Klaus Voormann, Revolver's art cover artist. Commenting on the cover, guitarist and main songwriter Takuro said:

The track "Hashire! Mirai" was used as the opening theme of the anime adaptation of Ace of Diamond. The track "Sakurabito", composed by Takuro upon request by the Fukushima Hamakaido Sakura Project, was included as the ending track of both compilations.

Track listing

References

External links
 Album profile at Glay's official website

2014 albums
Glay albums